McKee Bridge is an unincorporated community in Jackson County, Oregon, United States. It lies south of Ruch along Upper Applegate Road off Oregon Route 238. The Applegate River flows by the community, in the Rogue River – Siskiyou National Forest.

A covered bridge called McKee Bridge crosses the river at this point. McKee Picnic Ground, a national forest site, is at the west end of the bridge along the river.

References

Unincorporated communities in Jackson County, Oregon
Unincorporated communities in Oregon